In Spanish towns and cities, the Policia Municipal (Municipal Police), also known as the Policia Local or Guardia Urbana, is a police force organized at the municipal level. From 2010 to 2015 Spain has between 61,867 and 66,400 local police officers distributed among all the Autonomous Communities.

Municipal police are authorized in every town and city of 5,000 or more people. The Policía Municipal de Madrid is the largest force and the Guàrdia Urbana de Barcelona is the second largest. In towns and villages that are too small to organize a municipal force, the function is performed by the Guardia Civil or by the Autonomous Community force. They are in some villages assisted by uniformed municipal employees with limited law enforcement authority called Vigilantes Municipales, Although their powers are in most cases quite limited. The local police services of individual towns and cities supplement the work of the National Police Corps, dealing with such matters as traffic, parking, monitoring public demonstrations, guarding municipal buildings, and enforcing local ordinances. They also collaborate with the National Police Corps by providing personnel to assist in crowd control.

Numbering about 37,000 individuals in 1986, municipal police officers are generally trained only with pistols and in a few smaller municipalities the local police do not routinely carry weapons whilst on normal duty. This is often the case where another, larger police force has a local station or barracks.

See also 
Guàrdia Urbana de Barcelona
Policía Municipal de Madrid

References 

 
Municipal law enforcement agencies